Jorcada is a volcano in the Andes, Bolivia. It is constructed by four fissures between Pastos Grandes and Laguna Colorada. Several stratovolcanoes, seven lava domes are constructed along the fissures, with craters ranging  in diameter.

The stratovolcanoes are of andesitic-dacitic composition and the lava domes have erupted rhyolite, and the last eruption occurred on the northwestern fissure 95,000 BP. On that fissure basaltic-andesitic centres were formed.

Sources 

Pleistocene stratovolcanoes
Stratovolcanoes of Bolivia
Stratovolcanoes of Chile
Complex volcanoes